Fresh Air is an American radio talk show broadcast on National Public Radio stations across the United States since 1985. It is produced by WHYY-FM in Philadelphia, Pennsylvania. The show's host is Terry Gross. , the show was syndicated to 624 stations and claimed nearly 5 million listeners. The show is fed live weekdays at 12:00 noon ET. In addition, some stations carry Fresh Air Weekend, a re-programming of highlights of the week's interviews. In 2016, Fresh Air was the most-downloaded podcast on iTunes.

Overview
The show began in 1975 at WHYY, with Judy Blank as host. In September of that year, Terry Gross took over as presenter and producer; over 45 years later she remains its chief presenter. In 1985, WHYY launched a weekly half-hour edition of Fresh Air, which was distributed nationally by NPR. The show began daily national broadcasts in 1987. The show is composed primarily of interviews with prominent figures in various fields, among them entertainment and the arts, culture, journalism, and global current affairs. This main segment is followed by shorter segments, most often comprising coverage and reviews of events and new releases in various cultural and entertainment spheres. The subjects of these shorter segments include movies, books, stage plays, television programs, as well as recordings of popular music, jazz, and classical music. The program also features commentary from a range of regular contributors, including Maureen Corrigan, David Bianculli, Dave Davies, Ken Tucker, Kevin Whitehead, John Powers, Lloyd Schwartz, Geoffrey Nunberg, Justin Chang, Milo Miles, and Ed Ward. The show was formerly titled "Fresh Air with Terry Gross" but is now simply branded "Fresh Air."

David Edelstein was let go from his position as film critic for the show on November 27, 2018, for comments made in the wake of Bernardo Bertolucci's death.

The executive producer of Fresh Air is Danny Miller. The program is produced and edited by Amy Salit, Phyllis Myers, Ann Marie Baldonado, Sam Briger, Lauren Krenzel, Heidi Saman, Therese Madden, Thea Chaloner, Seth Kelley and Susan Nyakundi. The show is directed by Roberta Shorrock. Audrey Bentham is the engineer. Molly Seavy-Nesper is the producer of Digital Media.

Background

The program's interviews are pre-recorded and edited, not broadcast live. As with many such radio programs, guests are often not in the studio during recording, and often speak remotely from a local affiliate station, or a home studio. When pressing news requires, the show has gone live, such as during the Soviet coup attempt of 1991, and in the aftermath of the Boston Marathon bombing on April 19, 2013.

Fresh Air interviews are generally first aired on the Monday through Thursday shows. The Friday shows are rebroadcasts of past interviews.

The show's theme song, a jazz piece called "Fresh Air", was composed for the program by Joel Forrester of The Microscopic Septet.

Controversial interviews

In February 2002, when Gross interviewed Gene Simmons of Kiss, Simmons discussed his sexual experimentation with women of all age groups and propositioned Gross in demonstration; according to NPR's website, Simmons withheld permission to supply transcripts or audio of the interview on their website.

In July 2010, Fresh Air was removed from Mississippi Public Broadcasting radio because of "recurring inappropriate content", shortly after the broadcast of an interview with comedian Louis C.K. in which he discussed his sex life. By mid-2011, it had returned to the state network's evening line-up.

Awards
In 1993, NPR, Fresh Air, and Gross were presented with the George Foster Peabody Award with praise for her "probing questions, revelatory interviews, and unusual insights". The show was inducted into the National Radio Hall of Fame in 2012. The show would win an institutional Peabody in 2022.

In 2004, Gross published a book of her favorite interviews from the show under the title All I Did Was Ask.

In 2016, Gross received the National Humanities Medal from President Barack Obama, "For her artful probing of the human experience. Her patient, persistent questioning in thousands of interviews over four decades has pushed public figures to reveal personal motivations behind extraordinary lives—revealing simple truths that affirm our common humanity."

References

Further reading

External links
 
Fresh Air Archive
 Streaming audio schedule

1975 radio programme debuts
American variety radio programs
English-language radio programs
Mass media in Philadelphia
NPR programs
Peabody Award-winning radio programs